The Bildt family is a Scandinavian noble family – uradel – of Danish origin, noted for counting two of its members as Swedish prime ministers. The Bildt family was naturalized as a Swedish noble family at the Swedish house of nobility in 1664 (No. 678).

Notable members 

 Carl Bildt (born 1949), Swedish prime minister
 Carl Bildt (1850–1931), Swedish diplomat and historian
 Gillis Bildt (1820–1894), Swedish baron and prime minister
 Knut Gillis Bildt 1854–1927), Swedish army officer and politician

References

Further reading 

 

Bildt family
Swedish noble families